Merthyr Tydfil railway station is a railway station serving the town of Merthyr Tydfil in Wales. It is the terminus of the Merthyr branch of the Merthyr Line. Passenger services are provided by Transport for Wales. The station has one platform, and is situated near to the Tesco Superstore in the town.

The station has a small car park, ticket office, passenger display panels and a taxi rank. Passengers wishing to use buses to other destinations have to walk through the town to the main bus station.

Since the Spring 2009 Timetable change on Monday 18 May, trains are able to arrive/depart from the station every half hour after the commissioning of a passing loop near Merthyr Vale.

History 

The first station in Merthyr was opened by the Taff Vale Railway on 21 April 1841 in Plymouth Street. This was the second stage of the building of the main line from Navigation House (later Abercynon). The station was closed on 1 August 1877 when all Taff Vale passenger traffic was diverted to the Great Western Railway station at Merthyr High Street.

In 1853, Merthyr High Street railway station opened as the terminus of the Vale of Neath Railway on the site. Designed by Isambard Kingdom Brunel, the two platform station encompassed  broad gauge lines, and was enclosed by an overall roof. The Vale of Neath also encompassed the Swansea and Neath Railway, enabling trains to run to Swansea docks, and after amalgamation with the Great Western Railway on 1 February 1865, also ran through trains to London Paddington.

Although other railways which ran into Merthyr had their own stations, after a third rail was added to the whole of the Vale of Neath system in 1863, the mixed gauge allowed them all to consolidate their services at Merthyr High Street:
Great Western Railway: trains from Hereford through to Swansea over a connection at Middle Duffryn
Taff Vale: to Cardiff (transferred from their own Plymouth Street terminus in 1877)
Brecon & Merthyr: onwards to Brecon
Rhymney Railway
London & North Western: to the Midlands (via Brynmawr and ) and Swansea
Cambrian Railways: Cardiff/Treherbert service to Aberystwyth via the Brecon & Merthyr route

After the whole of the Great Western system was converted to standard gauge on 11 May 1872, a thin central platform was later added to the station, adding two additional platforms.

After the end of steam trains, and the closure of all but the Taff Vale lines into the station between 1951 and 1964, the passenger facilities were rebuilt by British Rail on the southwest corner of the original site in 1974 as a single island providing two platforms. A further rebuild in 1996 saw it reduced to its present single platform configuration, with a Tesco superstore and other retail outlets now occupying the rest of the old station site.

Services 
As mentioned above, the station now has a half-hourly service to and from Cardiff Central on weekdays and Saturdays. On Sundays there is a two-hourly service from Barry Island and to Bridgend via the Vale of Glamorgan Line.

References

External links 

Railways of Merthyr Tydfil - Merthyr Tydfil Central Station.  Photos of the station over the years

Railway stations in Merthyr Tydfil County Borough
DfT Category E stations
Former Great Western Railway stations
Railway stations in Great Britain opened in 1853
Railway stations served by Transport for Wales Rail